Alan Madoc Roberts (born 1941)FRS is an English academic serving as Emeritus professor of Zoology in the School of Biological Sciences at the University of Bristol.

Education
Roberts was educated at Rugby School and the University of Cambridge, where he studied Natural Sciences (Zoology) at Trinity College, Cambridge. He went on to study at the University of California, Los Angeles (UCLA) where he was awarded a PhD in 1967 for research supervised by Theodore Holmes Bullock on the escape response of Crayfish.

Awards and honours
Roberts was elected a Fellow of the Royal Society (FRS) in 2015. His certificate of election reads:

References

Living people
Fellows of the Royal Society
Alumni of the University of Cambridge
University of California, Los Angeles alumni
People from Rugby, Warwickshire
People educated at Rugby School
1941 births